Erythrolamprus ceii is a species of snake in the family Colubridae. The species is found in  Bolivia and Argentina.

References

Erythrolamprus
Reptiles of Bolivia
Reptiles of Argentina
Reptiles described in 1991
Taxa named by James R. Dixon